The 2018 The Citadel Bulldogs football team represented The Citadel, The Military College of South Carolina in the 2018 NCAA Division I FCS football season. The Bulldogs were led by third-year head coach Brent Thompson and played their home games at Johnson Hagood Stadium. They were members of the Southern Conference (SoCon). They finished the season 5–6, 4–4 in SoCon play to finish in a three-way tie for fifth place.

Previous season
The Bulldogs finished the 2017 season 5–6, 3–5 in SoCon play to finish in a tie for sixth place.

Preseason

Preseason media poll
The SoCon released their preseason media poll on July 25, 2018, with the Bulldogs predicted to finish in seventh place. The same day the coaches released their preseason poll with the Bulldogs also predicted to finish in seventh place.

Preseason All-SoCon Teams
The Bulldogs placed five players on the preseason all-SoCon teams.

Offense

1st team

Tyler Davis – OL

2nd team

Drew McEntyre – OL

Defense

1st team

Aron Spann III – RB

2nd team

Ja'Lon Williams – DL

Noah Dawkins – LB

Schedule

Source:

Roster

Game summaries

at Wofford

Chattanooga

at Mercer

at Towson

East Tennessee State

at VMI

Furman

at Western Carolina

Samford

at Alabama

Charleston Southern

References

Citadel
The Citadel Bulldogs football seasons
2018 in sports in South Carolina